The Battle of Mursa was fought on 28 September 351 between the eastern Roman armies led by the Emperor Constantius II and the western forces supporting the usurper Magnentius. It took place at Mursa, near the Via Militaris in the province of Pannonia (modern Osijek, Croatia). The battle, one of the bloodiest in Roman history, was a pyrrhic victory for Constantius.

Background 

Following Constantine I's death in 337 the succession was far from clear. Constantine II, Constantius II, and Constans were all Caesars overseeing particular regions of the empire, although none of them were powerful enough to claim the title of Augustus. Fueled by the belief that Constantine wished for his sons to rule a tripartite empire after him, the military massacred other members of Constantine's family. This massacre precipitated a re-divisioning of the empire, by which Constantine took Gaul, Hispania, and Britain, while Constans acquired Italy, Africa, Dacia, and Illyricum, and Constantius inherited Asia, Egypt, and Syria.

After attempting to impose his authority over Carthage and being blocked, Constantine II attacked his brother Constans in 340, but was ambushed and killed near Aquileia in northern Italy. Constans took possession of the provinces of the west, and ruled for ten years over two-thirds of the Roman world. In the meantime, Constantius was engaged in a difficult war against the Persians under Shapur II in the east.

Rebellion of Magnentius

In 350, the mismanagement of Constans had alienated his generals and civilian officials and Magnentius had himself proclaimed Augustus of the west, resulting in the murder of Constans. Magnentius quickly marched his army into Italy, appointing Fabius Titanius as praefectus urbi consolidating his influence over Rome. By the time Magnentius' army arrived at the Julian passes, Vetranio, Constans' lieutenant in Illyricum, had been declared Augustus by his troops. Magnentius initially attempted a political dialogue with Constantius and Vetranio, but the rebellion of Nepotianus in Rome changed his intentions from joining the Constantian dynasty to supplanting it. It was during this rebellion that Magnentius promoted his brother Decentius to Caesar.

Constantius' reaction was limited. Already involved in a war with the Sasanian Empire, he was in no position to deal with Magnentius or Vetranio. Following Shapur's retreat from Nisibis, Constantius marched his army to Serdica meeting Vetranio with his army. Instead of a battle, both Constantius and Vetranio appeared before the latter's army, and Vetranio agreed to abdicate. Constantius then advanced west with his reinforced army to encounter Magnentius.

The battle 
Magnentius marched an army of around 36,000 Gallic infantry, auxilia palatinae, Franks, and Saxons down the Via Militaris and besieged Mursa. His siege was short-lived as Constantius' army arrived and Magnentius was forced to retreat. Magnentius formed up his army on the open plain north-west of Mursa, near the Drava River.

Once his army was deployed, Constantius sent his praetorian prefect, Flavius Philippus, with a peace offer. Constantius himself was not present at the battle; he heard of his army's victory from the bishop of Mursa while visiting the tomb of a Christian martyr. Whereupon, Constantius informed those of the Christian community that his victory was due to God's aid.

Aftermath 
Following his victory at Mursa, Constantius chose not to pursue the fleeing Magnentius, instead spending the next ten months recruiting new troops and retaking towns still loyal to Magnentius. In the summer of 352, Constantius moved west into Italy, to find that Magnentius had chosen not to defend the peninsula. After waiting until September 352, he made Naeratius Cerealis praefectus urbi and moved his army to Milan for winter quarters. It would not be until the summer of 353 that Constantius would move his army further west to confront Magnentius at the Battle of Mons Seleucus.

Historiography of the battle
Numerous contemporary writers considered the loss of Roman lives at Mursa a disaster for the Roman Empire. Crawford states the barbarian contingents took the lion's share of the casualties, and yet the losses suffered at Mursa, according to Eutropius, could have won triumphs from foreign wars and brought peace. Zosimus called the battle at Mursa a major disaster, with the army so weakened that it could not counter barbarian incursions, while modern academics have labeled the battle a pyrrhic victory for Constantius.

Notes

References

Sources

 

351
Croatia in the Roman era
350s in the Roman Empire
Mursa Major 351
Mursa Major
Military history of Croatia
Constantius II